Tarpaper Sky is the fourteenth solo studio album by Rodney Crowell.  Crowell co-produced the album with long-time collaborator Steuart Smith and Dan Knobler.  Tarpaper Sky follows Crowell's Grammy-winning duet album with Emmylou Harris, Old Yellow Moon and is his first release on New West.

Tarpaper Sky is made up of entirely original Crowell compositions.  Doug Freeman of the Austin Chronicle credits Crowell for "balancing ballads and bar room stomps ... with his characteristic sense of autobiographical detail and precarious mortality."

The track, "God I'm Missing You," originally appeared on the 2012 Vanguard Records release Kin: Songs by Mary Karr & Rodney Crowell.  Lucinda Williams performed the song on that compilation album.  The phrase "Tarpaper Sky" appears in a line in that song.

Critical reception

Tarpaper Sky garnered critical acclaim by music critics. At Metacritic, they assign a "weighted average" rating called a Metascore to albums based upon the ratings and reviews by selected independent publications, and the album's score is an 84 out of 100 with nine reviews used, which means the album received "universal acclaim". Thom Jurek of Allmusic rated the album four stars out of five, stating that "This is Crowell at his best: focused, balanced, clever, at times profound" on a release that is "a welcome return to form." At The Independent, Andy Gill rated the album four stars out of five, saying how the release "finds him relaxed and confident in his craft". Steve Johnson of the Chicago Tribune rated the album three-and-a-half stars out of four, writing that "With effortless melodies played with the grace and unforced power from a veteran band, 'Tarpaper Sky' showcases Crowell's still-potent voice, all honey and cedar and sly inflection, and his knack for finding the words to make simple wisdom and an older man's reflections resonate." At USA Today, Steve Jones rated the album three-and-a-half stars out of four, stating that this is a "fine collection of retro-sounding and embraceable tunes." At Country Weekly, Tammy Ragusa graded the album an A−, writing that "His lyrics are overflowing with imagery and meaning [...] both weighty and witty [...] and his voice is laden with texture."

Luke Torn of Uncut rated the album an eight out of a ten, writing how "Crowell’s versatile, impassioned voice is in fine fettle, a confident mix of goofiness and longing, anticipation and excitement, sadness and sentimentality, as if he’s just now entering a new prime." At American Songwriter, Hal Horowitz rated the album three-and-a-half stars out of five, saying that " the organic Tarpaper Sky is a welcome reminder that at 63 he remains capable of releasing beautifully crafted music that can stand toe to toe with his best." Stuart Henderson of Exclaim! rated the album a nine out of a ten, stating that "This is just vintage Crowell, which is to say that Tarpaper Sky is an essential record by one of the best." At The Austin Chronicle, Doug Freeman rated the album three-and-a-half stars out of five, writing how the release "proves that the Houston Kid in his 60s remains as vital as ever, balancing ballads and bar room stomps, both cut with his characteristic sense of autobiographical detail and precarious mortality." Eric R. Danton of Paste rated the album a seven-point-three out of ten, saying that "Though these 11 songs aren’t always as sharply drawn as his best material, there’s plenty to love here." At Blurt, Lee Zimmerman rated the album four stars out of five, stating that "Tarpaper Sky finds Crowell yet again emphasizing the superior songwriting skills that have been his stock in trade since the very beginning."

Track listing
All songs were written by Rodney Crowell except where noted.

"The Long Journey Home" - 4:23
"Fever on the Bayou" (Crowell, Will Jennings) - 3:57
"Frankie Please" - 2:43
"God I'm Missing You" (Crowell, Mary Karr) - 3:55
"Famous Last Words of a Fool in Love" - 3:50
"Somebody's Shadow" (Crowell, Quinten Collier) - 3:29
"Grandma Loved That Old Man" - 3:43
"Jesus Talk to Mama" - 3:40
"I Wouldn't Be Me Without You" - 3:28
"The Flyboy & The Kid" - 3:55
"Oh, What a Beautiful World" - 5:08

Personnel
Rodney Crowell - lead vocal, acoustic guitar and electric guitar
Steuart Smith - lead electric and acoustic guitar, mandolin, bass, organ, harmonica and harmony vocals
Michael Rhodes - bass
John Hobbs - piano
Eddie Bayers - drums and piano

Guest performances
Michael Rojas - piano
Steve Fishell - steel guitar
Deanie Richardson - fiddle
Will Kimbrough - acoustic guitar, accordion & harmony vocals
Dan Knobler - electric guitar
Jerry Roe - drums
Shannon McNally - vocal
John Cowan - harmony vocals
Pat Buchanan - harmony vocals
Cory Chisel - harmony vocals
Mike Ferris - harmony vocals
Perry Coleman - harmony vocals
Chely Wright - harmony vocals
Tanya Hancheroff - harmony vocals
Vicki Hampton - harmony vocals
Robert Bailey - harmony vocals
Vince Gill - harmony vocals
Ronnie McCoury - harmony vocals

Chart performance
The album debuted  at No. 168 on the Billboard 200, and at No. 25 on the Top Country Albums chart with 3,000 copies sold in its debut week.

References

2014 albums
Rodney Crowell albums
New West Records albums
Albums produced by Rodney Crowell